The 2002 FIBA World Championship Final was the concluding basketball game which determined the winner of the 2002 FIBA World Championship. The game was played on 8 September 2002 in the Conseco Fieldhouse in Indianapolis, Indiana.

Route to the finals
Note: In all results below, the score of the finalist is given first.

Match details

References

External links
 
 

2002 FIBA World Championship
FIBA Basketball World Cup Finals
Serbia and Montenegro national basketball team games
Argentina national basketball team games
Basketball competitions in Indianapolis
September 2002 sports events in the United States
2002 in sports in Indiana
2000s in Indianapolis